Kappelberg may refer to the following hills in Germany:

 Kappelberg (Baden-Württemberg) (469 m), a hill in the Stuttgart region of Baden-Württemberg
 Kappelberg (Bavaria), a hill in the borough of Bissingen in the county of Dillingen an der Donau, Bavaria
 Kappelberg (Rhenish Hesse) (358 m), a hill in Rhenish Hesse, Rhineland-Palatinate